NGC 4743 is a lenticular galaxy located about 145 million light-years away in the constellation Centaurus. NGC 4743 was discovered by astronomer John Herschel on June 8, 1834. It is a member of the Centaurus Cluster.

See also 
 List of NGC objects (4001–5000)
 NGC 4683

References

External links

Centaurus (constellation)
Lenticular galaxies
4743 
43653 
Centaurus Cluster
Astronomical objects discovered in 1834